WFAB (890 AM) is a radio station broadcasting a Christian radio format. It is licensed to Ceiba, Puerto Rico.  The station is owned by Daniel Rosario Diaz.

History
The station went on the air as WJSE on April 1, 1987. On April 6, 1988, it changed its call sign to WRRE, and on January 15, 1989, to WFAB.

References

External links

FAB
Radio stations established in 1987
Ceiba, Puerto Rico
1987 establishments in Puerto Rico